The 2011–12 Montenegrin First League was the sixth season of the top-tier football in Montenegro. The season began on 6 August 2011 and ended on 30 May 2012, with a winter break beginning on 8 December 2011. Mogren are the defending champions.

Teams 
Bar were directly relegated to the Montenegrin Second League after finishing 12th at the end of last season; the club returned to the second level after just one year. Their place was taken by 2010–11 Second League champions Bokelj, who returned to the top league of Montenegro after an absence of three seasons.

10th-placed Mornar and 11th-placed Sutjeska had to compete in two-legged relegation play-offs. Sutjeska kept their place in the First League by beating Second League runners-up Jedinstvo Bijelo Polje 1–0 on aggregate. On the other hand, Mornar were relegated after losing to Second League third-placed team FK Berane on away goals; the two-leg affair ended 1–1. Berane thus made their immediate return to the league, while Mornar were relegated after two seasons in the top flight.

Stadia and locations

League table

Results
The schedule consisted of three rounds. During the first two rounds, each team played each other once home and away for a total of 22 matches. The pairings of the third round were then set according to the standings after the first two rounds, giving every team a third game against each opponent for a total of 33 games per team.

First and second round

Third round
Key numbers for pairing determination (number marks position after 22 games):

Relegation play-offs
The 10th-placed team (against the 3rd-placed team of the Second League) and the 11th-placed team (against the runners-up of the Second League) will both compete in two-legged relegation play-offs after the end of the season.

Summary

Matches

Jedinstvo won 2–0 on aggregate.

Mornar won 5–1 on aggregate.

Top scorers

References

External links
 Season on soccerway.com

Montenegrin First League seasons
Monte
1